Norman Stanley Angelini (September 24, 1947 – December 21, 2019) was a Major League Baseball pitcher who played for two seasons. He pitched for the Kansas City Royals for 21 games during the 1972 season and seven games during the 1973 season.

Angelini attended Junípero Serra High School then Washington State University, where he played college baseball for the Cougars from 1968–1969.

Angelini died on December 21, 2019.

References

External links

1947 births
2019 deaths
Kansas City Royals players
Richmond Braves players
San Mateo Bulldogs baseball players
Major League Baseball pitchers
Baseball players from San Francisco
Washington State Cougars baseball players
Junípero Serra High School (San Mateo, California) alumni